Michael Legge (born 11 December 1978) is a retired Irish actor.

He has appeared in a number of stage, film, television and radio roles. He is best known for playing the teenage Frank McCourt in Alan Parker's 1999 film, Angela's Ashes. He also played another Limerick character in the film Cowboys & Angels.

Legge attended St Colman's College, Newry. He now resides in Copenhagen and has become a Life Coach.

Filmography

Film

Theatre

Television

Awards and nominations

References

External links

Michael Legge Yahoo! group page
Shameless official website
Official Shameless Myspace page
Official Harchester Site
"Talented British Actors" site

1978 births
Living people
People from Newry
Male television actors from Northern Ireland
Male film actors from Northern Ireland
Male stage actors from Northern Ireland
Irish male voice actors
People educated at St Colman's College, Newry